This is a list of Australian Statutory Instruments from 1901 to 1908 inclusive.

Australian Statutory Instruments by year:
 List of Statutory Instruments of Australia, 1901
 List of Statutory Instruments of Australia, 1902
 List of Statutory Instruments of Australia, 1903
 List of Statutory Instruments of Australia, 1904
 List of Statutory Instruments of Australia, 1905
 List of Statutory Instruments of Australia, 1906
 List of Statutory Instruments of Australia, 1907
 List of Statutory Instruments of Australia, 1908

See also  
 List of Acts of the Parliament of Australia

Lists of the Statutory Instruments of Australia